MacDonald Airfield was an airfield built alongside the former northern road, west of Stuart Highway, north of Pine Creek, Northern Territory, Australia during World War II.

History
The airfield was constructed by the 43rd Engineer Regiment (US Army) in March 1942 with further improvements undertaken by the 808th Engineer Aviation Battalion between 11 May 1942 and 16 July 1942 and later by the Allied Works Council and No 1 Airfield Construction Unit RAAF.

Renamed MacDonald Airfield in honour of Wing Commander Joshua Roger Gray McDonald of No. 13 Squadron RAAF who was killed at Laha on 10 December 1941.

The Royal Australian Air Force occupied the base on 24 November 1942 when No. 54 Operational Base Unit administered the base.

The airfield became an Australian Army communication camp and was abandoned in 1945.

Units based at MacDonald Airfield
43rd Engineer Regiment (US Army)
808th Engineer Aviation Battalion
No. 1 Airfield Construction Unit RAAF
No. 18 (Netherlands East Indies) Squadron RAAF (B-25) – (18 January 1943 until 7 May 1943)
No. 54 Operational Base Unit RAAF

See also
 List of airports in the Northern Territory

References

Pacific War Wrecks Database
OzatWarWebsite

Former Royal Australian Air Force bases
World War II airfields in Australia
Defunct airports in the Northern Territory
Airports established in 1942
1942 establishments in Australia